Multiple kernel learning refers to a set of machine learning methods that use a predefined set of kernels and learn an optimal linear or non-linear combination of kernels as part of the algorithm. Reasons to use multiple kernel learning include a) the ability to select for an optimal kernel and parameters from a larger set of kernels, reducing bias due to kernel selection while allowing for more automated machine learning methods, and b) combining data from different sources (e.g. sound and images from a video) that have different notions of similarity and thus require different kernels. Instead of creating a new kernel, multiple kernel algorithms can be used to combine kernels already established for each individual data source.

Multiple kernel learning approaches have been used in many applications, such as event recognition in video, object recognition in images, and biomedical data fusion.

Algorithms
Multiple kernel learning algorithms have been developed for supervised, semi-supervised, as well as unsupervised learning. Most work has been done on the supervised learning case with linear combinations of kernels, however, many algorithms have been developed. The basic idea behind multiple kernel learning algorithms is to add an extra parameter to the minimization problem of the learning algorithm. As an example, consider the case of supervised learning of a linear combination of a set of  kernels . We introduce a new kernel , where  is a vector of coefficients for each kernel. Because the kernels are additive (due to properties of reproducing kernel Hilbert spaces), this new function is still a kernel. For a set of data  with labels , the minimization problem can then be written as

This optimization problem can then be solved by standard optimization methods. Adaptations of existing techniques such as the Sequential Minimal Optimization have also been developed for multiple kernel SVM-based methods.

Supervised learning

For supervised learning, there are many other algorithms that use different methods to learn the form of the kernel. The following categorization has been proposed by Gonen and Alpaydın (2011)

Fixed rules approaches
Fixed rules approaches such as the linear combination algorithm described above use rules to set the combination of the kernels. These do not require parameterization and use rules like summation and multiplication to combine the kernels. The weighting is learned in the algorithm. Other examples of fixed rules include pairwise kernels, which are of the form
. 
These pairwise approaches have been used in predicting protein-protein interactions.

Heuristic approaches
These algorithms use a combination function that is parameterized. The parameters are generally defined for each individual kernel based on single-kernel performance or some computation from the kernel matrix. Examples of these include the kernel from Tenabe et al. (2008). Letting  be the accuracy obtained using only , and letting  be a threshold less than the minimum of the single-kernel accuracies, we can define

Other approaches use a definition of kernel similarity, such as

Using this measure, Qui and Lane (2009) used the following heuristic to define

Optimization approaches
These approaches solve an optimization problem to determine parameters for the kernel combination function. This has been done with similarity measures and structural risk minimization approaches. For similarity measures such as the one defined above, the problem can be formulated as follows:

where  is the kernel of the training set.

Structural risk minimization approaches that have been used include linear approaches, such as that used by Lanckriet et al. (2002). We can define the implausibility of a kernel  to be the value of the objective function after solving a canonical SVM problem.  We can then solve the following minimization problem:

where  is a positive constant. 
Many other variations exist on the same idea, with different methods of refining and solving the problem, e.g. with nonnegative weights for individual kernels and using non-linear combinations of kernels.

Bayesian approaches
Bayesian approaches put priors on the kernel parameters and learn the parameter values from the priors and the base algorithm. For example, the decision function can be written as

 can be modeled with a Dirichlet prior and  can be modeled with a zero-mean Gaussian and an inverse gamma variance prior. This model is then optimized using a customized multinomial probit approach with a Gibbs sampler.

These methods have been used successfully in applications such as protein fold recognition and protein homology problems

Boosting approaches
Boosting approaches add new kernels iteratively until some stopping criteria that is a function of performance is reached. An example of this is the MARK model developed by Bennett et al. (2002) 

In this way, each iteration of the descent algorithm identifies the best kernel column to choose at each particular iteration and adds that to the combined kernel.

Semisupervised learning
Semisupervised learning approaches to multiple kernel learning are similar to other extensions of supervised learning approaches. An inductive procedure has been developed that uses a log-likelihood empirical loss and group LASSO regularization with conditional expectation consensus on unlabeled data for image categorization. We can define the problem as follows. Let  be the labeled data, and let  be the set of unlabeled data. Then, we can write the decision function as follows.

The problem can be written as

The CEC penalty is defined as follows. Let the marginal kernel density for all the data be

Expectation regularization is then performed on the MKD, resulting in a reference expectation  and model expectation . Then, we define 

where  is the Kullback-Leibler divergence.
The combined minimization problem is optimized using a modified block gradient descent algorithm. For more information, see Wang et al.

Unsupervised learning
Unsupervised multiple kernel learning algorithms have also been proposed by Zhuang et al. The problem is defined as follows. Let  be a set of unlabeled data. The kernel definition is the linear combined kernel . In this problem, the data needs to be "clustered" into groups based on the kernel distances. Furthermore, we minimize the distortion by minimizing . Finally, we add a regularization term to avoid overfitting. Combining these terms, we can write the minimization problem as follows.

where . One formulation of this is defined as follows. Then, . Note that these groups must be learned as well. For more information, see Zhuang et al.

Libraries
Available MKL libraries include
 SPG-GMKL: A scalable C++ MKL SVM library that can handle a million kernels.
 GMKL: Generalized Multiple Kernel Learning code in MATLAB, does  and  regularization for supervised learning.
 (Another) GMKL: A different MATLAB MKL code that can also perform elastic net regularization
 SMO-MKL: C++ source code for a Sequential Minimal Optimization MKL algorithm. Does -n orm regularization.
 SimpleMKL: A MATLAB code based on the SimpleMKL algorithm for MKL SVM.
 MKLPy: A Python framework for MKL and kernel machines scikit-compliant with different algorithms, e.g. EasyMKL and others.

References

Machine learning algorithms
Data mining